Reichenstein may refer to:

Places
 Reichenstein, in Silesia, now Złoty Stok, Poland
 Reichenstein, in Bohemia, now Rejštejn, Czech Republic
 Reichenstein, in Zweisimmen, Bernese Oberland, Switzerland
 Lordship of Reichenstein, a lordship in the Lower Rhenish–Westphalian Circle of the Holy Roman Empire
 Golden Mountains (Sudetes), on the border of Czech Republic and Poland
 Eisenerzer Reichenstein in the Ennstal Alps,  Styria, Austria, the location of the Reichenstein Smeltery
 Admonter Reichenstein  in the Ennstal Alps, Styria, Austria

Buildings 
 Burg Reichenstein (Oberpfalz), a castle in Stadlern, Bavaria, Germany
 Reichenstein Castle (Trechtingshausen), a castle in Rhineland-Palatinate, Germany
 Reichenstein Castle (Arlesheim), a castle in Arlesheim, Basel Canton, Switzerland
 Reichenstein Castle (Westerwald), a castle in Rhineland-Palatinate
 Schloss Reichenstein, a water castle in Inzlingen, Baden-Wüttemberg, Germany

People with the surname
 Franz-Joseph Müller von Reichenstein ( 1741 –  1825 or 1826), Austrian mineralogist
William Reichenstein (born 1947), British sprint canoer

See also
Reichensteiner, a white wine grape